Faith (also known as The Great Doctor) is a 2012 South Korean television drama starring Lee Min-ho and Kim Hee-sun. It was broadcast by SBS from August 13 to October 30, 2012, on Mondays and Tuesdays at 21:55 (KST) time slot for 24 episodes. It is about a modern-day plastic surgeon, who is kidnapped and brought back in time to the Goryeo period, 700 years in the past, where she falls in love with her kidnapper, a warrior who is the leader of the royal guard.

Title
The title Sin-ui, can mean faith, as in belief in justice. The Hanja  means Divine Doctor, but in Hangul it also means divine healer or great doctor.

Synopsis
After King Gongmin of Goryeo (Ryu Deok-hwan) marries the Yuan princess, Noguk (Park Se-young), they return to Goryeo. On their way, they are attacked, and the queen is fatally injured. According to the advice of his royal advisor, the king orders the Captain of the Royal Guard, Choi Young (Lee Min-ho), to pass through a mystical portal ("heaven's gate") and find the "heaven's doctor". Choi Young travels to the future and brings back Yoo Eun-soo (Kim Hee-sun), a modern-day doctor from Seoul, to save the queen's life. He promises that he will return her to her world once she saves the queen, but the royal advisor schemes and persuades King Gongmin to force Eun-soo to stay as she can be useful to him.

As Eun-soo accustoms herself to her new surroundings, she and Choi Young gradually fall in love with each other. But problems arise as others become fascinated with her as the "Heaven's doctor", and Eun-soo becomes a pawn in the political power plays between King Gongmin, the Yuan overlords, the sociopathic nobleman Ki-Chul (Yu Oh-seong) and Prince Deok-Seung (Park Yoon-jae), King Gongmin's uncle. Constantly risking his life, Choi Young thwarts numerous attempts by Ki-Chul and Deok-Seung, who are out to have Eun-soo in their possession.

The series follows how Choi Young and Eun-soo evade and overcome impending problems and whether or not they succeed in getting her to heaven's door in time before it closes for good.

Cast

Main
 Lee Min-ho – General Choi Young
In the mid-1300s, approximately 1352, Choi Young is a bodyguard to King Gongmin of the Goryeo Dynasty. He is 29 years old and has no regrets in life, no ambition for women or money, and his hobby is sleeping. As a brave captain and strategist of the Woodalchi warriors, he is not afraid of death.
 Kim Hee-sun – Yoo Eun-soo
A 33-year-old plastic surgeon in the year 2012. Eun-soo was originally a general surgeon but quickly found that it was an overworked, under-paid profession and jumped ship to plastic surgery. Her dream is to someday open her own practice. But one day a strange man whom she thinks is a drama extra kidnaps her and takes her back to the Goryeo era. In Goryeo, she is believed to be the apprentice of the famous Chinese surgeon, Hwata, sent from heaven.

Supporting 
 Yu Oh-seong – Ki-chul
 Ryu Deok-hwan – King Gongmin
 Park Se-young – Queen Noguk
 Lee Phillip – Jang Bin
 Sung Hoon – Chun Eum-ja
 Shin Eun-jung – Hwa-su-in 
 Lee Byung-joon – Jo Il-shin
 Kim Mi-kyung – Court Lady Choi, Choi Young's aunt
 Park Sang-won – Sohn-yoo
 Baek Kwang-doo – Bae Choong-seok
 Kim Jong-moon – Oh Dae-man
 Kang Chang-mook – Deol-bae
 Yoon Kyun-sang – Oh Deok-man
 Kim Soo-yeon – Deo-ki
 Park Yoon-jae – Prince Deok-seung
 Jung Yoo-chan – Joo-seok
 Kwon Min – Ahn Do-chi
 Kim Hyun as Ji-ok's criminal
 Ahn Jae-wook – Eun-soo's doctor ex-boyfriend (cameo, ep. 1)
 Oh Kwang-rok – fortune teller (cameo, ep. 1)
 Choi Min-soo – Moon Chi-hoo, leader of Jeokwoldae (cameo, ep. 4)
 Oh Jae-moo – Yi Seong-gye (이성계)

Original soundtrack

Part 1

Part 2

Part 3

Part 4

Part 5

Part 6

Part 7

Ratings
In this table,  represent the lowest ratings and  represent the highest ratings.

Production and trivia
"Faith" was '90s drama queen Kim Hee-sun's comeback project, her first TV appearance in five years after her marriage and childbirth.
The production of "Faith" was riddled with problems. The initial budget was 10 billion won (about US$10 million) but the series got its budget slashed, and was pushed back multiple times because of the leading actor. 
The drama was announced in 2009 with Lee Joon-gi as a main lead. However, the actor had to be replaced because he was drafted in the army. Born in 1982, Lee would normally have time to enlist until the end of 2010 but he received his papers early, shortly after beginning his new film project. This forced him to drop "Faith", as well as his horse-racing movie Grand Prix, which had already begun shooting. Lee had tried to postpone enlistment to finish these two projects by the end of the year, but was unable to do so.

He was replaced by Kang Ji-hwan (Coffee House) who, however, had to withdraw after a request by the Entertainment Management Association because of his ongoing contract dispute and legal fight with his former and current management companies. The antagonist, Kim Seung-soo, also left, with the majority of the original cast at that time. This was a severe blow to the budget, as 10 million won had reportedly been spent on promotion with Kang as the lead.
Actors like Oh Ji-ho and Lee Sang-yoon were considered for the main role, before finally deciding for Lee Min-ho. It seems that at that time the story itself was rewritten to some extent. A released trailer with Kang Ji-hwan showed a different atmosphere, much darker, more epic and dramatic than what was finally filmed. 
 
Filming for "Faith" began on May 24, 2012 and it aired from August 13 to October 30, 2012. The ratings were mediocre but rarely dropped below 10%.

On October 19, a little before the end, the news was published that Lee Phillip (who played Dr. Jang Bin), sustained an eye injury and had to pull out of the drama. The injury did not arise during drama filming, but because he was scheduled for surgery next week he would not be able to continue shooting. Many viewers agreed that "It's too bad that he leaves so close to the drama's finale without getting to be a part of it. On the other hand, it's both fortunate for the drama and a damn shame for him that he's barely a presence in the show to begin with, despite the setup hinting at a much meatier role".

The writer Song Ji-na uploaded the original script on her website and it was obvious that there were considerable changes in the final product, some of them because of lack of money. However, Faith had financial problems almost from its start and they did not finish after the drama wrapped. Six months after the end of its airing, many of the cast and crew of that drama had not been paid. The acting, editing, and producing salaries which had not been paid amounted to 1.7 billion won. Drama producer and direction Kim Jong-hak, whose credits include Eyes of Dawn, Sandglass, Daemang (2002) and Legend (2007), was accused of double-contracting the Faith OST rights (to two separate companies) in the fall of 2012 became the subject of a police investigation for embezzlement and breach of trust. Kim was sued in February 2013 under the charge that he had embezzled 2 billion for personal use and summoned by police for ongoing investigation. He took his own life on July 23, 2013, by carbon dioxide, in a gositel room. This tragic death and many of the "ills" of Korean dramas have been attributed to the outsourcing of production to independent companies which struggle to cover the exorbitant cost of writers and stars.

Faith was sold to 6 Asian countries including Japan, Indonesia, Singapore, and Malaysia, with 90% of the total pre-sales amount of  coming from Japan.

Awards and nominations

References

External links
 The Great Doctor official SBS website 
 
 

2012 South Korean television series debuts
2012 South Korean television series endings
Seoul Broadcasting System television dramas
Korean-language television shows
South Korean time travel television series
South Korean fantasy television series
South Korean historical television series
South Korean medical television series
Television series set in Goryeo
Television shows written by Song Ji-na
Television series set in the 14th century